The PCSO Lottery Draw is a Philippine television game show produced by the Philippine Charity Sweepstakes Office (PCSO). It airs daily (except Christmas, New Year and Maundy Thursday to Easter Sunday) on the People's Television Network (PTV) since March 8, 1995, and involves the PCSO workforce consisting of more than 2,000 employees. The program consists of drawing of both parimutuel and fixed payout lottery games, sweepstakes games, and since November 15, 2017, it added the centralized draws of the Small Town Lottery (Pares, Swer3 and Swer2) for the provinces that do not conduct their own local STL draws.

The program is also simulcast over DZME 1530 kHz, and Brigada News FM stations, formerly on DZIQ 990 kHz and PCSO and PTV's websites, Facebook pages and YouTube accounts.

History
The program was launched on March 8, 1995, became first known as "Philippine Lotto Draw" with original hosts. Tina Revilla, Kathy De Leon-Villar and various hosts (e.g. Timmy Cruz).

In 2013, the program change its name known as the "Philippine Lottery Draw".

Since 2016, the show was renamed known as "PCSO Lottery Draw".

On October 27, 2019, the program launched a new segment called Handog Pasasalamat sa Pamilyang Pilipino, as part of the 85th-anniversary celebration of the PCSO. Five families from a selected barangay will receive various items, such as grocery items and cash prizes, from a sponsor, usually associated with PCSO. The segment is hosted by one of the main hosts and a guest co-host, either by Dennis Padilla or Gary Lim. It is held every Monday, Wednesday, Friday, and Sunday.

In October 2022, 433 people struck the jackpot in a single draw day, which was the highest number of people ever to win the Grand Lotto's top prize. This prompted suspicion among many people, including statistics experts.

Draw procedure
Before every draw, day begins with the airing of a clip in which the blowing machines, called "Mega Gems", and the balls used in each game are inspected to ensure that everything is fair and nothing is concealed in the machines and balls for the draw day. The inspection is undertaken by a panel of judges, composed of a neutral set of people not connected with the PCSO. Representatives from the Commission on Audit oversee the proceedings and the draw to see that everything goes according to protocol. The pre-draw procedure is as follows:
The panel inspects each of the Mega Gems to be used in the draws for a draw day, including the interior of the blowing chamber and the blowing mechanisms. This is to make sure there is nothing hidden in the Mega Gems that will invalidate the entire draw, such as hidden balls or obstructions. The Mega Gems are also given a dry run using a set of unmarked ping-pong balls to test if they would work as they should come to the actual draw.
The balls to be used in each game are stored inside briefcases. There are usually three cases of balls to be used on each game, distinguished by either numbers or uppercase or lowercase letters. The panel randomly chooses one set using cards and its chosen card is shown. In the lot games such as the Super Lotto 6/49 and 2D Lotto, the balls are of one colour, and each set may have a different colour. In the digit games such as the 6D Lotto, no matter the set is chosen, each digit from 0 to 9 has a different colour, and each set is identical. In Small Town Lottery games, all balls are of one colour.
After one set of balls has been chosen for a game, each of the balls is weighed to see if they have the same or almost the same weight using a digital scale. This part of the procedure is covered by a separate video camera, which will record any abnormal circumstance, such as ball switching or a ball which either is overweight or is too light, should it comes out.
After the balls for the game are weighed, they are loaded by hand by the head of the panel into the loading bays of the game's Mega Gem. This is the only first of the two times human intervention is needed as each Mega Gem is operated using a remote console stationed a small distance away from the unit. The second, never shown but implied, is the removal of the balls from the Mega Gem after each draw show has ended and the results of the draws are recorded. In the case of digit lottery games, the removal of balls is the third time, as the drawn balls are also adjusted (see below).

Each Mega Gem, depending on the type of game, as already mentioned, is operated by automation. The Mega Gem loads the balls from the loading bays to the draw chamber, after which the blower starts to mix the balls. In the number lottery games (excluding the Power Lotto), the machine draws six numbers one-by-one and is inserted into the inner left loading bay. In machines used in the 2D Lotto and the digit lottery games, each number/digit in the combination is drawn from its own chamber. Once a ball is drawn, it is locked into place by slats placed over the pipe leading from the drawing chamber. Once the necessary number of balls has been picked, the Mega Gem is turned off.

The Mega Gem used in Power Lotto (mentioned below) was a compound version of the two types of Mega Gems stated above. The chamber which drew the main five numbers has its ball loading bays placed at the back but had a separate tube where the five drawn number balls are directed. It was operated the same way as the Mega Gem used in the other number lottery games. The chamber that draws the power number was the same one used as those in 6D Lotto. The first chamber was first turned on to draw the five main numbers. Afterwards, the first chamber was turned off and the second chamber was then switched on to draw the power number. After the power number has been drawn, the entire machine was turned off.

Balls typically have numbered all over their outer edges. The numbers on balls used in number lottery games (except the 2D Lotto), are read on the spot without the need of touching them. In the digit lottery games and the 2D Lotto with top drawing Mega Gems, the balls are adjusted to clearly show the numbers drawn. Because of the nature of the Power Lotto Mega Gem, each of the methods mentioned were applied in each of the machine's two chambers.

However, since 2014, the balls are no longer adjusted, instead, the numbers on balls are read on the spot by the host. This applies to all games.

The winning combination on December 30, 2020, 6/55 9PM are: 04 05 07 12 17 18. The jackpot prize is P256,564,464.35, and there was only one winner.

The Games
The PCSO Lottery Draw currently hosts a total of nine games, each with its own combinations and mechanics of play.

The number lottery games are:

Pari-mutuel games
Lotto 6/42 is the flagship lotto draw, first introduced on March 8, 1995. The game was initially introduced in Luzon, with a separate game for "VisMin" (Visayas and Mindanao) geographical regions as a single unit. The two draws were later combined into a nationwide one in November 9, 2004. As the name states, a six-number combination is chosen from a lot of numbers from 1 to 42. To win a prize, at least three of one's chosen numbers must match with those of the six winning numbers. The odds of getting all six winning numbers, and thus the jackpot, are 1 in 5,245,786. Draws are held on Tuesdays, Thursdays and Saturdays.
Mega Lotto 6/45 was introduced on May 17, 1997, and a more improved version of the 6/42 draw and is also introduced as a nationwide one. As the name states, a six-number combination is chosen from a lot of numbers from 1 to 45. As with 6/42, at least three of one's chosen numbers must appear among the six winning numbers to win a prize. The odds of getting all six winning numbers are much larger at 1 in 8,145,060. Draws are held on Mondays, Wednesdays and Fridays.
Super Lotto 6/49 was introduced on July 16, 2000, and increases odds and makes winning more difficult than the previous two, this time with a lot of numbers ranging from 1 to 49. Draw mechanics are the same. The odds of winning are now higher at 1 in 13,983,816. Draws are held on Tuesdays, Thursdays and Sundays.
Grand Lotto 6/55 was introduced on April 18, 2010. Draw mechanics are the same as the previous three, but this time, the number lot is from 1 to 55. The Grand Lotto draw and currently uses the larger of the two-chamber Power Lotto Saturn Machine. While its minimum jackpot is pegged at ₱30,000,000, it had the Power Lotto's ₱108,000,000 final jackpot as its jackpot prize on its first draw. The odds are at 1 in 28,989,675. Draws are held on Mondays, Wednesdays and Saturdays. On July 9, 2022, a single bettor wins the jackpot prize of ₱401,186,804.80, making it the third largest jackpot prize won. Also, for the first time in history, on October 1, 2022, a jackpot prize worth ₱236,091,188.40 was divided among 433 winners. The winning numbers are said to be in skip counting by 9, as the results were 9, 45, 36, 27, 18, 54. Others claimed it was an error or system glitch of winners.
Ultra Lotto 6/58 is the most recent of all the lottery draw. It was launched on February 7, 2015. Its first draw was on February 8, 2015. Draw mechanics are the same as the previous four, but this time, the number is from 1 to 58. The draw of February 8, 2015, to February 12, 2017, was held from Fridays and Sundays only. But starting February 14, 2017, Draws are now held on Tuesdays, Fridays and Sundays. Making the pari-mutuel games of Lotto 6/42 and Super Lotto 6/49 extended as three pari-mutuel games every Tuesdays only. Its minimum jackpot is PHP50,000,000.00. The odds are, at their highest, at 1 in 40,475,358. On October 14, 2018, two bettors from Albay and Samar split the ₱1,180,622,508 (US$21,862,177) jackpot, the largest won.

There are also three-digit lottery games. Unlike the number lottery games, the digits must appear in "exact order", i.e. in the order of the numbered chambers from which each digit is drawn:
4D Lotto  was introduced on August 4, 1997, and uses a four-chambered Mega Gem, each drawing a digit from 0 to 9. To win, one must have at least the last two digits of the winning combination. The odds of winning are 1 in 10,000. Draws are held on Mondays, Wednesdays, and Fridays.
6D Lotto is a game in the style of a traditional sweepstakes. It was also introduced on December 11, 1997, draws six digits from six Orbits. To win, one must have at least the first or last three digits of the winning combination in exact order. Odds in winning are increased at 1 in 1,000,000. Originally it was played in Luzon areas only. But it was played nationwide since February 11, 2020. Draws are held on Tuesdays, Thursdays, and Saturdays.

Fixed payout games
3D Lotto was launched on June 13, 2002, as Swertres Lotto, a portmanteau of the words swerte (Filipino for luck) and tres (Spanish for three), in Visayas and Mindanao (later expanded to Luzon in 2006). It uses three Gems, each drawing a digit from 0 to 9. The 3D Lotto game is drawn 3 (three) times daily, Monday-Sunday. Originally, the nationwide draws are in the morning (11 AM), afternoon (4 PM), and evening (on PTV) (9 PM). Since August 24, 2020, the new timeslot are adjusted to 2:00 PM, 5:00 PM, and 9:00 PM (All timeslots are Live via PTV). This game is arguably the most popular among the fixed payout games, garnering a solid following in social media, especially through a variety of Facebook groups.

A multitude of websites have also been created and are updated regularly every after the morning, afternoon, and evening draws are recorded. Most of these websites also try to compile and pseudo-analyze results based on prevailing results and techniques used by bettors of the game—this despite the results having been randomly drawn.

2D Lotto was launched on July 5, 2004, as EZ2 Lotto in Luzon (later expanded to Visayas and Mindanao in 2006). It uses two Standard Dailies, each of which draws a number from a lot of 1 to 31, ensuring no possibility of the same number appearing twice in a combination or a Double. To win the jackpot, one must have the two numbers in exact order as they appear in the chambers. The odds of getting the exact order are 1 in 961. The odds in LLAVE order are 1 in 465. Therefore 465 numbers are LLave (Rambol) (01-02, 02–01). Just like the 3D Lotto, the 2D Lotto is drawn 3 (three) times daily, Monday-Sunday. Originally, the nationwide draws are in the morning (11 AM), afternoon (4 PM), and evening (on PTV) (9 PM). Since August 24, 2020, the new timeslots are adjusted to 2:00 PM, 5:00 PM, and 9:00 PM (All timeslots are Live via PTV).

Small Town Lottery games

From November 15, 2017, to March 17, 2020 (11 AM), centralized Small Town Lottery games were added into the show. The results of these draws are for provinces that do not have a local franchise of STL. The Small Town Lottery games are also held three times daily. Originally, the centralized Small Town Lottery was held every 11 AM, 4 PM, and 9 PM. Since 2020, the Small Town Lottery will not conduct a centralized draw. Instead, it will be conducted a Localized Draw with separate games for Visayas and Mindanao Only (Every 10:30 AM, 3 PM, and 7 PM). 

STL Pares uses a single-chambered machine, which draws two numbers from 1 to 40. After the first number is drawn, the machine restarted to draw the second number. To win a prize, one must match the numbers in exact order.
STL Swer3 uses a three-chamber machine, with each one drawing a number from 0 to 9. Until October 1, 2019(4 PM), it is originally single-chambered, but now it uses three separate chambers. It is similar to 3D Lotto in gameplay.
STL Swer2 uses a two-chamber machine, each one drawing a number from 0 to 9. Like STL Swer3, it is also originally single-chambered, until October 1, 2019(4 PM), and is formerly known as STL 2-Digits.

Defunct games
Power Lotto 5-55+1 was introduced on June 17, 2008, and used 1 Saturn and 1 Gem, the Saturn draws 5 numbers out of 55 balls numbered from 1 to 55, and the Gem draws one ball out of 10 balls numbered from 1 to 10 for the power number. Its minimum jackpot is PHP 50,000,000.00. The odds of winning the jackpot are at 1 in 34,787,610. It was replaced by Grand Lotto 6/55 in April 2010.
Bingo Milyonaryo was introduced in 2013, Not only it was played at 9pm, It was also played during the 11am and 4pm draws, The First 4 machines. (B, I, N, G) are numbers 0 to 9 while the Other 2 Machines (O And M) Were 0 to 38. it was discontinued in 2015 in favor of Ultra Lotto 6/58.

Hosts
Erik Imson
Romi Sison
Dindo de Viterbo
Jasper Espino
Queenie Balita-Aranas
Fe Celebrado III
Sherrie Pamintuan

Production
On July 27, 2019, the program was put into temporary hiatus following a verbal order from President Rodrigo Duterte to suspend all gambling-related operations of PCSO due to corruption allegations. However, the program partially resumed on July 31 as the suspension of the lotto game was lifted by the President. The Small Town Lottery, remains suspended until August 22, 2019.

On March 17, 2020, the program was put into temporary hiatus for the second time, as PCSO gaming operations and small-town lotteries in Luzon (later expanded to Visayas and Mindanao on April 7) were suspended for the second time following the implementation of enhanced community quarantine in Luzon amid the COVID-19 pandemic in the Philippines. but the program partially resumed for the second time on July 20, 2020, with a catch-up draw for tickets sold prior to the suspension of the gaming operations during the enhanced community quarantine. and the program fully resumed, along with lotto operations on August 7 (originally scheduled on August 4) in areas under general community quarantine (GCQ) and modified general community quarantine (MGCQ), The Small Town Lottery, among other games, remains suspended.

See also
 Philippine Charity Sweepstakes Office
 Gambling in the Philippines

References

External links
PCSO Official Website
PCSO Lotto Results

Lotteries by country
Philippine game shows
People's Television Network original programming
1995 Philippine television series debuts
Filipino-language television shows
Television productions suspended due to the COVID-19 pandemic
Game shows about lotteries
1990s Philippine television series
Gambling in the Philippines